Renata Simril is the president and CEO of LA84 Foundation. Formed in 1985, originally as the Amateur Athletic Foundation, the LA84 Foundation is a legacy of the 1984 Los Angeles Olympic Summer Games. The LA84 Foundation runs youth sport programs, infrastructure, research, and education across eight Counties of Southern California, and is a national leader in elevating the role that sports play in positive youth development.

LA84 Foundation
Three primary activities support the Foundation's mission ("Life Ready Through Sport") of expanding youth sports in Southern California: grant-making investments in sports activities intended to create, expand and/or enhance structure youth sport participation across the region, with particular emphasis on under-served communities, including girls, ethnic minorities, and physically challenged and developmentally disabled; coaching education and training; and, research, youth sports related resources and public information.

The Foundation has impacted the region through investments of $230 million in grants and programs to more than 2,200 organizations in support of over 3 million young people; support of the construction and/or renovation of over 100 sports facilities; educational/training clinics for more than 80,000 coaches; and, one of the nation's largest sports libraries and an Olympic memorabilia collection.

Career
Ms. Simril most recently served as Senior Vice President and Chief of Staff to the Publisher of the Los Angeles Times, where she oversaw staff operations and special projects. Her earlier career included three seasons with the Los Angeles Dodgers, where she served as Senior Vice President of External Affairs overseeing the restoration of the Dodgers brand and the Dodgers Foundation; and over a decade in real estate development with Jones Lang LaSalle, Forest City Development and LCOR, Inc.

Her public service included stints as Deputy Mayor for Economic Development and Housing in the Hahn Administration, where she worked to expand rental and affordable housing in Los Angeles, and as a Development Deputy to Los Angeles City Councilman Mark Ridley-Thomas, where she worked to help rebuild communities in South Los Angeles after the 1992 civil unrest. Ms. Simril began her career in the U.S. Army as a Military Police Officer in the U.S. and Germany.

Community activity
Ms. Simril is active in the community outside of LA84 Foundation, currently serving on the Boards of United Way of Greater Los Angeles; LA 2028 Olympic Bid Committee; Los Angeles Sports and Entertainment Commission and the Los Angeles Dodgers Foundation. She formerly served as a Governor's Appointee on the California Science Center Board, where she led successful negotiations of long-term lease agreements for USC to manage and operate the Coliseum and Sports Arena properties; as chair of the Board of Regents for LMU, and as a member of the Lusk Center for Real Estate at USC.

She was named to the Orange County Register's 50 Most Powerful in Southern California Sports list in 2017  and to the  Los Angeles Business Journal's list of The Los Angeles 500 Most Influential People in 2016 and 2017. CSQ magazine named her a Visionary in Sports and Entertainment, 2017, and Simril received the WISE LA (Women in Sports and Entertainment) Women of Inspiration award in 2016. Sports Business Journal recognized Simril as one of their Game Changers in September 2017.

Personal
Ms. Simril is a third generation Angeleno. She earned a bachelor's degree in Urban Studies from Loyola Marymount University and a master's degree in Real Estate Development from the University of Southern California.

References

Year of birth missing (living people)
Living people
American women chief executives
Loyola Marymount University alumni
University of Southern California alumni
21st-century American women